San Martino may refer to:

Saint Martin (disambiguation), a number of saints

Places

Italy

Towns
 Adrara San Martino, a comune in Bergamo province, Lombardy
 Borgo San Martino, a comune in Alessandria province, Piedmont
 Campo San Martino, a comune in Padua province, Veneto
 Cazzago San Martino, a comune in Brescia province, Lombardy
 Fara San Martino, a comune in Chieti province, Abruzzo
 Monte San Martino, a comune in Macerata province, Marche
 San Martino Agelli, a village in Sant'Anatolia di Narco, Perugia province, Umbria
 San Martino Alfieri, a comune in Asti province,  Piedmont
 San Martino al Cimino, a borough of Viterbo, Lazio
 San Martino al Tagliamento, a comune in Pordenone province, Friuli-Venezia Giulia
 San Martino Buon Albergo, a comune in Verona province, Veneto
 San Martino Canavese, a comune in Turin province, Piedmont
 San Martino d'Agri, a comune in Potenza province, Basilicata
 San Martino dall'Argine, a comune in Mantua province, Lombardy
 San Martino del Lago, a comune in Cremona province, Lombardy
 San Martino di Finita, a comune in Cosenza province, Calabria
 San Martino di Lupari, a comune in Padua province, Veneto
 San Martino di Taurianova, a frazione of the comune of Taurianova, in Reggio Calabria
 San Martino di Venezze, a comune in Rovigo province, Veneto
 San Martino in Pensilis, a comune in Campobasso province, Molise
 San Martino in Rio, a comune in Reggio Emilia province, Emilia-Romagna
 San Martino in Strada, a comune in Lodi province, Lombardy
 San Martino Sannita, a comune in Benevento province, Campania
 San Martino Siccomario, a comune in Pavia province, Lombardy
 San Martino sulla Marrucina, a comune in Chieti province, Abruzzo
 San Martino Valle Caudina, a comune in Avellino province, Campania
 Vigano San Martino, a comune in Bergamo province, Lombardy

Other places in Italy
 Monte San Martino (Lecco), a mountain of Lombardy, in the Bergamo Alps
 San Martino di Castrozza, a ski resort in Trento province, Trentino-Alto Adige/Südtirol

France
 San-Martino-di-Lota,a commune in the Haute-Corse department on the island of Corsica

Spain
 San Martiño, an island off the north coast of Spain
 San Martiño (Cíes Islands), an island off the west coast of Spain

Churches

Italy
 Certosa di San Martino, a charterhouse, or monastery complex in Naples
 San Martino ai Monti, a basilica church in Rome
 San Martino del Vescovo, a parish church in central Florence
 San Martino (Siena), a church in Siena
 San Martino, Venice, a church near the Arsenale in Venice

Croatia
St. Martino di Vettua, Labinština Peninsula, Istria County, Croatia

People
 Ettore Perrone di San Martino (1789-1849), Italian politician and military leader
 Gustavo Ponza di San Martino (1810-1876), Italian politician
 Master of San Martino alla Palma, Florentine painter active during the first third of the 14th century

Poetry 
 San Martino

Other 
 Battle of San Martino, a battle between Venetians and Florentines in the 15th century

See also
 St. Martin's (disambiguation)
 San Martín (disambiguation)
 Sankt Martin (disambiguation)
 São Martinho (disambiguation)